Alpha Mu Sigma was an historically Jewish fraternity founded in  at Cooper Union.

History
According to Baird's (20th), "The original plan was to limit membership to men of the Jewish faith and the first expansion was limited to similar engineering institutions."

Its Founders were:

Baird's goes on to further describe that, "With the prosperity of the s expansion took place quickly, but many of the chapters did not survive the [G]reat [D]epression."

Demise
Alpha chapter at Cooper Union functioned until .

Total membership in 1945, 1,500.

Symbols
Publication: The Shield.

Chapter List
These were the chapters of Alpha Mu Sigma. Active chapters that withdrew or merged into other organizations shown in bold; dormant chapters shown in italics.

Notes

See also
 List of Jewish fraternities and sororities
 Tau Delta Phi
 Tau Epsilon Phi

References

Student organizations established in 1914
1914 establishments in New York (state)
Historically Jewish fraternities in the United States
Jewish organizations established in 1914